Roger Lambrecht (1 January 1916 – 4 August 1979) was a Belgian road bicycle racer. He rode professionally from 1945 to 1954 and won 18 races, which included two stages of the 1948 and 1949 Tour de France; he wore the yellow jersey for two stages in 1948 and one stage in 1949.

Major results

1946
 Callac
 Circuit de l'Aulne/GP Le Télégramme à Châteaulin
1948
 Dijon – Lyon
 Hautmont
 Plonéour-Lavern
 Redon
 Sint-Niklaas
Tour de France:
 7th place overall classification
Winner stage 17
1949
 Winner stage 2 Critérium du Dauphiné Libéré
 Redon
 Sint-Niklaas
Tour de France:
 11th place overall classification
Winner stage 2
Wearing yellow jersey for one day
1950
Tour de France:
 13th place overall classification
1952
 Rouen
 Saint-Pol-de-Leon – Brest

External links 

Palmarès of Roger Lambrecht
Official Tour de France results for Roger Lambrecht

1916 births
1979 deaths
Cyclists from West Flanders
Belgian male cyclists
Belgian Tour de France stage winners
People from Beernem